Bondo may refer to:

Bondo people, in Orissa, India
Bondo language, the Austroasiatic language spoken by them
Bondo (putty), two-part putty used in automotive, household, and marine applications, created by Bondo Corporation
Jeremy Bonderman (born 1982), American baseball pitcher
Sande society (also: Bondo, Bundo or Bundu), a women's association found in parts of West Africa, especially Sierra Leone

Places
Bondo, Democratic Republic of the Congo, a town on the Uele River in the north
Bondo District in Kenya
Bondo, Ivory Coast
Bondo, Kenya, a town in Bondo District
Bondo Constituency, one of two constituencies in Bondo District
Bondo, Mali
Bondo, Switzerland, a municipality in the Swiss canton of Grisons/Graubunden/Grigioni
Bondo, Trentino, a frazione in Trentino, Italy
Bondo, Uganda, a town in Arua District, in northwestern Uganda